The Dutch Alcon blue (Phengaris alcon arenaria) was a subspecies of the Alcon blue butterfly (Phengaris alcon). There is not much known about this subspecies, but it has always been very rare. It was endemic to the Netherlands, where two populations were known. One in Meijendel (dunes north of The Hague), and in the Meije (in the neighbourhood of the Nieuwkoopse Plassen). The population in the Meije disappeared in 1975 and in Meijendel this subspecies disappeared in 1979.

See also 
 List of extinct animals of Europe
 List of extinct animals of the Netherlands

References 
 Maas, P. 2005. Duingentiaanblauwtje - Maculinea alcon arenaria. The Extinction Website. Downloaded on 24 October 2014.

Phengaris
Brood parasites
Extinct animals of Europe
Extinct butterflies
Extinct insects since 1500
Butterfly subspecies